James Stevenson (5 February 1877 – 1 December 1936) was a British cyclist. He competed in two events at the 1912 Summer Olympics.

References

External links
 

1877 births
1936 deaths
British male cyclists
Olympic cyclists of Great Britain
Cyclists at the 1912 Summer Olympics
Sportspeople from North Lanarkshire